Carol Gianotti of Perth is a female Australian ten-pin bowler. She is a member of the Professional Women's Bowling Association (PWBA) Hall of Fame in 2020, the Tenpin Bowling Australia Hall of Fame  in 2016 and the United States Bowling Congress (USBC) Hall of Fame in 2011. She has won sixteen professional women's bowling titles before being inducted into the Hall of Fame in 2011. Gianotti had a professional career that lasted from 1989 to 2000. She inspired other Australians and women abroad to join the professional tour.

Gianotti was the first Australian woman to be inducted into the USBC and PWBA Hall of Fame in the United States. She competed for Australia in the 1988 Seoul Olympic Games when bowling was introduced as a demonstration sport.

Gianotti, who debuted in the PWBA in 1989 at the age of 21, was an instant success after winning her maiden championship and major in her first appearance on tour. The tournament was the 1989 USBC Queens, the women's pro tour's most prestigious major.

On her debut as a youth bowler, she earned one gold and three silver medals at the Asian Youth Championships in 1985 held in Jakarta, Indonesia. Representing Australia at the 1988 Seoul Olympic Games was a career milestone leading up to the PWBA.

Gianotti also competed at the 2009 World Tenpin Bowling Association World Women's Championships in Las Vegas, Nevada and 13th World Women’s Championship
at Cashman Center, Las Vegas and won the silver and bronze medal in doubles with Ann-Maree Putney.

Personal life
Gianotti was born and reared in Perth, Western Australia (WA). Her mother Jan, as well as her father Bruno, both represented Australia and Western Australia, while her siblings Robyn and Mark likewise had successful bowling careers. After AMF Morley was erected next door to her family's house in 1977, Gianotti began her career in the sport at the age of ten.

References 

Australian ten-pin bowling players
1960s births
Living people
Year of birth uncertain